The Sherman Nursery Company Historic District is a nationally recognized historic district located in Charles City, Iowa, United States.  It was listed on the National Register of Historic Places in 2014.  The district includes a two-story stone building that was built in 1902 and three stone bridges.  The nursery was founded and developed by E. M. Sherman (1862-1934).  By the 1920s it grew to "become the largest grower of evergreens in the world, with more than 50,000,000 pieces in the field."  It was also known for its roses.  The adjacent Wildwood Park was part of the Sherman property until 1912 when E.M. and Gertrude Sherman sold the property to the city for the park.

References

Buildings and structures completed in 1902
Charles City, Iowa
Historic districts in Floyd County, Iowa
National Register of Historic Places in Floyd County, Iowa
Industrial buildings and structures on the National Register of Historic Places in Iowa
Historic districts on the National Register of Historic Places in Iowa